Nenu Pelliki Ready is a 2003 Indian Telugu-language romantic comedy film directed by Vamsy and starring Srikanth, Laya, Anita, Vidya and Sangeetha.

Plot

Gopi is a happy single man. Due to his grandparents' influence, he goes to a marriage bureau and chooses three women (Savitri, Bhavana, Neha). Gopi does not fall in love with the women although they all fall in love with him. The film is about how Gopi distances himself from them and falls in love with the bureau owner Priya.

Cast 

Srikanth as Gopikrishna
Laya as Bhavna 
Anita as Savithri 
Vidya as Neha
Sangeeta as Priya 
M. S. Narayana as Gopikrishna's grandfather
Sunil
Mallikarjuna Rao
Kondavalasa Lakshmana Rao
Jeeva
Dharmavarapu Subramanyam
Ali
Ananth
Benarjee
Gowtham Raju
Ahuti Prasad
Rama Prabha as Gopikrishna's grandmother
Jayalalita
Jenny

Soundtrack
The music is composed by Chakri.
"Nuvvunte Chaalu" (Male) - Hariharan
"Gopalakrishna Pelli Kaavaala Gopemma Laanti Pilla Kaavaala"
"Saavi One Saavi Two Saavi Three" - Smita, Shankar Mahadevan
"Chandramukhi Chandramukhi" - Shankar Mahadevan
"Nuvvunte Chaalu" (Female) - Sunitha
"Neevu Nenu Okatele"
"Mugguru Bhaamala Premala Mundara Bandheenayyane"

Reception
G. Manjula Kumar of The Hindu wrote that "Though there is nothing new to write about the storyline, the dialogue, timing and good performances make Venki win the day despite a few glitches here and there". Rakesh P. of Deccan Herald wrote that "But, with the narration being slow, the comic banter fails to keep the audience engrossed. Nothing great about the music score by Chakri". Jeevi of Idlebrain.com opined that "Though director tried making this film a hilarious fare by inserting lots of comedy in it, he could not built the much needed tempo in narration".  Manju Latha Kalanidhi of Full Hyderabad stated that "Director Venky makes a genuine attempt at comedy with this light comedy".

References

2000s Telugu-language films
2003 films
Indian romantic comedy films